The 2021 Reading and Leeds Festival took place between 27 and 29 August 2021 in Reading, Berkshire, and Leeds, West Yorkshire, over the August bank holiday weekend. The headliners were Liam Gallagher, Biffy Clyro (who replaced Queens of the Stone Age), Stormzy, Catfish and the Bottlemen, Post Malone and Disclosure. This was the first Reading and Leeds festival since the 2019 edition as the 2020 edition was cancelled due to the COVID-19 pandemic in England.

Changes for 2021 edition 
For this year's edition, Reading & Leeds decided on hosting two main stages at each location, one to the west and one to the east. This was done by dropping the BBC Radio 1 stage. They would also combine both The Pit/The Lock Up stage, and the Festival Republic stage together. Each stage taking up one day of the festival.

Line-up 
Once the second wave of artists were announced, 4 acts had to cancel due to 'circumstances out of their control'. These acts were Charli XCX, Da Baby, Doja Cat and 100 Gecs.

On 28 July 2021, the festival announced that more artists were added to the line-up, and also that some more artists had to pull out. Most notably, one of the headliners, Queens of the Stone Age had to pull out. Although there was no specific COVID-19 reasoning, the band plus many more international artists had to pull out from appearing at the festival, possibly due to COVID-19 travel restrictions. Other artists that had to pull out were Wallows, Denzel Curry, Madison Beer, Sofi Tukker, Oliver Tree, Tate McRae, Nation of Language, Super Whatever and MizorMac.

On 14 August 2021, more acts were announced along with some more drop outs which were Gallows, Surfaces, Cleopatrick, Ho99o9, Spritbox and 070 Shake. These were due to "various restrictions and logistics".

On the week leading up to the weekend of the festival, Machine Gun Kelly had to pull out of the festival because of 'restrictions and logistics'. He was replaced by Blossoms.

The day before the festival, Fever 333 and Creeper both had to cancel their appearances for "circumstances out of their control - one of those being a COVID-19 protocol". With both bands performing simultaneously on The Pit, they were replaced by one act, that being Waterparks. Fever 333's other set on the Main Stage was replaced by You Me at Six.

Jxdn also pulled out of the festival, but the reason and place are unknown.

Main Stage East 
Reading set times in Brackets in BST (British Summer Time) and headliners in Bold.

Setlists

Main Stage West

BBC Radio 1 Dance Stage

The Lock Up/The Pit/Festival Republic Stage

BBC Radio 1Xtra Stage

BBC Music Introducing Stage

The Alternative Stage

COVID-19 vaccine 
It was announced that there would be 'Vaccine Tents' at both locations for people to have their COVID-19 vaccine. The vaccines were on offer at Reading Festival between 9.30am and 5pm from Thursday 26 August until Sunday 29 August, and from 9am to 1pm on Monday 30 August. At Leeds Festival, the vaccine was offered from 10am until 4pm from Friday 27 August to Sunday 29 August, and from 8am to 11am on Monday 30 August. Health Professionals were also available at Leeds Festival on Thursday 26 August between 10am and 4pm to for revellers to discuss the vaccine. On Wednesday 27 August 2021, there was a two-hour slot at lunchtime for festival staff to have the jab. There was also a slot for early arrivals to have jab on the afternoon of Wednesday 27 August 2021.

Dr Nikki Kanani, a GP and deputy lead for NHS England's vaccination programme, said: "Thanks to the hard work of NHS staff and volunteers, more than half a million young people aged between 16 and 17 have had their first dose as teams across the country have worked tirelessly to get their communities protected, vaccinating at convenient pop-up clinics in the park, at places of worship and stadiums, and now at Reading and Leeds [Festival]". It is great to see the return of live music and performances, and as festival-goers head to the main stage this weekend to see their favourite headliners, I am also urging anyone who hasn't had to add the 'vaccine tent' to their festival itinerary to get that lifesaving vaccine as the best protection we can get from Coronavirus". Health Secretary Sajid Javid insisted getting a jab is "one of the most important things you can do to protect yourself and your loved ones." He said: "Vaccines are saving lives and allowing us to regain the freedoms we've been looking forward to over the last 18 months - from visiting family abroad to festivals and gigs." He finished by saying: "Its brilliant to see different sectors and industries stepping up to help get the country vaccinated, making it easier than ever to get your jab."

Live coverage 
Highlights of Reading and Leeds Festival were shown on BBC One - Stormzy's set was shown at 11.55pm on Saturday 28 August and Liam Gallagher's set was shown at 11.35pm on Sunday 29 August, BBC iPlayer - for up to a year after the festival, on BBC Radio 1 - from 11am on all three days, BBC Radio 1Xtra - from 7pm on Saturday 28 August 2021 and BBC Music's YouTube channel - which features playlists of top performances from the 2019 edition and there was also plenty of catch-up videos from this year's edition.

References 

Reading and Leeds Festivals
2021 festivals in Europe
2021 in England
21st century in Reading, Berkshire
2020s in Leeds